Getahovit is a village in the Ijevan Municipality of the Tavush Province of Armenia.

History

References

External links 

Populated places in Tavush Province